General Dundas may refer to:

David Dundas (British Army officer) (1735–1820), British Army general
Francis Dundas (c. 1759–1824), British Army general
Henry Dundas, 3rd Viscount Melville (1801–1876), British Army general
Ralph Dundas (1730–1814), British Army general
Robert Lawrence Dundas (1780–1844), British Army lieutenant general
Thomas Dundas (British Army officer) (1750–1794), British Army major general